is a Japanese professional  basketball player who plays for Tokyo Dime. She also plays for Japan women's national 3x3 team.

References

1995 births
Living people
Japanese women's basketball players
Sportspeople from Chiba Prefecture
21st-century Japanese women